WILV (91.1 FM) is a radio station broadcasting a Christian Contemporary format as an affiliate of K-LOVE. Licensed to Loves Park, Illinois and serving the Rockford, Illinois area, the station is currently owned by Educational Media Foundation.

History
WILV began broadcasting as WGSL on March 28, 1988. The station was owned by Rockford First Assembly of God and aired a Christian format branded "Radio 91", with the slogan "Your Home for Life". The station aired Christian talk and teaching programs such as In Touch with Dr. Charles Stanley, Back to the Bible, Focus on the Family, and Grace to You with John MacArthur, as well as Christian music and Pacific Garden Mission's Christian radio drama Unshackled!. In 2009, the station was sold to Educational Media Foundation, along with 100.9 WQFL, for $2 million.

References

External links

Contemporary Christian radio stations in the United States
K-Love radio stations
Radio stations established in 1988
1988 establishments in Illinois
Educational Media Foundation radio stations
ILV